Howard White "Smiley" Johnson (September 22, 1916 – February 19, 1945) was a professional American football offensive lineman in the National Football League. He played the 1937, 1938 and 1939 college football seasons at the University of Georgia before joining the Green Bay Packers for the 1940 and 1941 seasons.

He joined the United States Marine Corps in 1942 and became an officer. In addition to seeing combat with the 4th Marine Division, he played for a service football team in Maui, Hawaii. He served with I Company, 3rd Battalion, 23rd Marines through the battles of Kwajalein, Saipan (earning a Silver Star), and Tinian. On February 19, 1945, 1st Lieutenant Johnson was killed in action by a mortar shell at the Battle of Iwo Jima and awarded a second Silver Star posthumously; he was one of three former NFL players to die on Iwo Jima along with Jack Chevigny and Jack Lummus. Johnson was buried at the National Memorial Cemetery of the Pacific in Honolulu on February 2, 1949.

References

1916 births
1945 deaths
American football offensive guards
Battle of Iwo Jima
Burials in the National Memorial Cemetery of the Pacific
Georgia Bulldogs football players
Green Bay Packers players
Players of American football from Nashville, Tennessee
Recipients of the Silver Star
United States Marine Corps officers
United States Marine Corps personnel killed in World War II